Artillery refers to any engine used for the discharge of large projectiles during war.

Artillery may also refer to:

Military
 Naval artillery, referring to any engine used for the discharge of large projectiles from ships
 Artillery Command (Italy)
 Artillery Corps (Egypt)
 Artillery Corps (Israel)
 Artillery Corps (Ireland)
 Royal Artillery

Arts and entertainment
 Artillery game, a subgenre of computer and video games

Music
 Artillery (band), a Danish thrash metal band
 "Artillery", a song by Infected Mushroom

Fine arts
 Artillery (magazine), an American contemporary art magazine
 Artillery (Roger de la Fresnaye), a 1911 painting

Sports
 Artilleryman (horse), Australian thoroughbred racehorse

See also
 List of artillery
 List of artillery by name